Vyara Vatashka (or Viara Vatashka, Bulgarian: Вяра Ваташка) (born February 20, 1980, in Sofia, Bulgaria) is a Bulgarian gymnast.

She took the Olympic silver medal in gymnastics at the 1996 summer olympics – women's rhythmic group all-around in connection with the Olympic gymnastic competitions in 1996 in Atlanta.

References 

Bulgarian rhythmic gymnasts
Olympic gymnasts of Bulgaria
Olympic silver medalists for Bulgaria
1980 births
Living people
Gymnasts from Sofia
Gymnasts at the 1996 Summer Olympics
Olympic medalists in gymnastics
Medalists at the 1996 Summer Olympics